Walter Bietila (12 February 1916 – 21 March 1996) was an American ski jumper who competed in the 1936 Winter Olympics and in the 1948 Winter Olympics.

References

1916 births
1996 deaths
American male ski jumpers
Olympic ski jumpers of the United States
Ski jumpers at the 1936 Winter Olympics
Ski jumpers at the 1948 Winter Olympics
United States Navy personnel of World War II